Join, or Die. is a political cartoon showing the disunity in the American colonies. Attributed to Benjamin Franklin, the original publication by The Pennsylvania Gazette on May 9, 1754, is the earliest known pictorial representation of colonial union produced by an American colonist in Colonial America. 

The cartoon is a woodcut showing a snake cut into eighths, with each segment labeled with the initials of one of the American colonies or regions. New England was represented as one segment, rather than the four colonies it was at that time. Delaware was not listed separately as it was part of Pennsylvania. Georgia, however, was omitted completely. Thus, it has eight segments of a snake rather than the traditional 13 colonies. The poster focused solely on the colonies that claimed shared identities as Americans. The cartoon appeared along with Franklin's editorial about the "disunited state" of the colonies and helped make his point about the importance of colonial unity. It later became a symbol of colonial freedom during the American Revolutionary War.

Role during the Seven Years' War 

The French and Indian War was a part of the Seven Years' War which pitted Great Britain alongside the Thirteen Colonies and their native allies against the French, New France and their native allies. Many American colonists wished to gain control over the lands west of the Appalachian Mountains and settle there (or make profits from speculating on new settlements). During the outbreak of the war, the American colonists were divided on whether or not to take the risk of actually fighting the French for control of the lands west of the Appalachian Mountains. The poster quickly became a symbol for the need of organized action against the threat posed by the French and their native allies during the conflict, as while many Americans were unwilling to participate in combat against the French, many more recognized that if the French colonies were not captured they would always pose a risk to the well-being and security of the Thirteen Colonies. Writer Philip Davidson stated that Franklin was a propagandist influential in seeing the potential in political cartoons to stir up public opinion in favor of a certain way of thinking. Franklin had proposed the Albany Plan and his cartoon suggested that such a union was necessary to avoid each colony being captured individually by the French. As Franklin wrote:

Role prior to and during the American Revolution

Franklin's political cartoon took on a different meaning during the lead up to the American Revolution, especially around 1765–1766, during the Stamp Act Congress. American colonists protesting against the rule of the Crown used the cartoon in the Constitutional Courant to help persuade their fellow colonists to rise up. However, the Patriots, who associated the image with eternity, vigilance, and prudence, were not the only ones who saw a new interpretation of the cartoon. The Loyalists saw the cartoon with more biblical traditions, such as those of guile, deceit, and treachery. Franklin himself opposed the use of his cartoon at this time, but instead advocated a moderate political policy; in 1766, he published a new cartoon MAGNA Britannia: her Colonies REDUCED, where he warned against the danger of Britain losing her American colonies by means of the image of a female figure (Britannia) with her limbs cut off. Because of Franklin's initial cartoon, however, the Courant was thought of in England as one of the most radical publications.

The difference between the use of Join or Die in 1754 and 1765 is that Franklin had designed it to unite the colonies for 'management of Indian relations' and defense against France, but in 1765 American colonists used it to urge colonial unity in favor of resisting laws and edicts that were imposed upon them. Also during this time the phrase "join, or die" changed to "unite, or die," in some states such as New York and Pennsylvania.

Soon after the publication of the cartoon during the Stamp Act Congress, variations were printed in New York, Massachusetts, and a couple of months later it had spread to Virginia and South Carolina. In some states, such as New York and Pennsylvania, the cartoon continued to be published week after week for over a year. On July 7, 1774 Paul Revere altered the cartoon to fit the masthead of the Massachusetts Spy.

Legacy
The cartoon has been reprinted and redrawn widely throughout American history. Variants of the cartoon have different texts, and differently labeled segments, depending on the political bodies being appealed to. During the American Revolutionary War, the image became a potent symbol of the unity displayed by the American colonists and resistance to Parliament and the Crown. It returned to service, suitably redrawn, for both sides of the American Civil War, as both Union and Confederacy held differing views on the nature of the Federal government.

 The Latin translation of Join, or Die (Jungite aut Perite) is used as the official motto of the Philadelphia Union soccer team. A snake is also featured in their logo as an allusion to this cartoon.
 A flag featuring this cartoon was prominently displayed in the opening credits of the 2008 TV miniseries John Adams and was the title for the first part of the miniseries.
 The Late Late Show former host Craig Ferguson has this cartoon tattooed on the inside of his right forearm reaching his wrist, to commemorate becoming an American citizen. Ferguson also named his comedy-talk show on the History Channel, Join or Die with Craig Ferguson, after the cartoon. The show began airing in February 2016.
 An image of the Join, or Die snake was delivered as a threat to a victim in the 2010 NCIS episode "Dead Air". It was used as a symbol for a Military At Home terrorist group.
 "Join Or Die" is the name given to the special edition of the video game Assassin's Creed III, which is set during the American Revolutionary War.
In the TNT show Falling Skies, when Pope and his gang of outlaws are cornered at gunpoint by Tom Mason, Pope asks Mason for options, to which Mason replies "Join, or Die!". The threat proves empty, as Pope is taken alive. Part of Mason's backstory included him being a Boston University history professor who taught the American Revolution as part of his curriculum.
On the Fox show Sleepy Hollow in the episode "Magnum Opus" in Season 2 Episode 10, the original Join or Die cartoon is shown and described as being drawn by Benjamin Franklin to secretly indicate an actual river.  Looking at the actual map, the place where the mouth of the snake is located is where the main characters find an enchanted sword.
The Philadelphia 76ers NBA team integrated the snake into its Liberty Bell logo to create a special edition 2018 playoffs logo, though it used the later alternate version, "Unite or Die."
Posters with the cartoon can be found in buildings throughout the video game Fallout 4. 
In the film, In the Shadow of the Moon (2019), a miniature flag printed with the snake is seen next to the flag of the militant terrorist group, in one of the final scenes.

See also

 Gadsden Flag
 Live Free or Die
 United we stand, divided we fall

References

Further reading
 Copeland, David. Join, or die': America's press during the French and Indian War." Journalism History (1998) 24#3 pp: 112–23 online
 Olson, Lester C. "Benjamin Franklin's pictorial representations of the British colonies in America: A study in rhetorical iconology." Quarterly Journal of Speech 73.1 (1987): 18–42.

American Revolution
Editorial cartoons
Works about the French and Indian War
Mottos
National symbols of the United States
Works by Benjamin Franklin
1754 works
Propaganda cartoons
Woodcuts
Snakes in art
1754 in politics
1754 in the Thirteen Colonies
18th-century prints
1750s neologisms